Kathy Smith is an American politician, a Democrat, and a former teacher. She currently serves as district supervisor of the Fairfax County Board of Supervisors, a position she was elected to on November 5, 2019. Smith has served on the Board since January 2016, where she is also chairwoman of the Board's Development Process Committee and as a member of several more committees. 

Before she was elected to the Board of Supervisors, Smith served as the Sully District Representative to the Fairfax County School Board for 14 years. From the beginning of her time in office, Smith has represented 100,000 residents.

Early life and career 
Smith is originally from New Jersey, and she began her career as a teacher. After graduating from Muhlenberg College with a dual Bachelor of Arts in sociology and elementary education, Smith taught first grade in New Jersey and then second grade at an international school in Saudi Arabia, for a total of seven years. She stopped working to raise her children full time until she began running for office. 

Smith moved to the Sully district of Fairfax, Virginia in 1984 with her husband, Steve. The couple have four grown children, who all attended Fairfax County Public Schools while growing up. Smith's public career began when she served as PTA president at the three schools her children attended: Poplar Tree Elementary School, Rocky Run Middle School, and Chantilly High School.

Political beliefs 
Smith is a member of the Democratic Party. Throughout her political career, she has advocated for improved education, transportation, and environmental protections.

Election Run, 2015-2016 
Smith first ran for office in 2015-16 as a candidate to replace retiring supervisor Michael R. Frey, who had held the position for 24 years. 

In a 2015 interview, Smith distinguished herself from her opponent, Republican John Guevara, by noting "We see the job of supervisor and the role of local government very differently." She went on to say that she would work full-time in the position, prioritize education, and approach issues "in a non-partisan manner to find common sense solutions to the challenges we face as our population ages and changes." Guevara later tried, unsuccessfully, to attack Smith on the basis of her husband's salary, saying that she could afford to be supervisor full-time because he still needed to work another job to support his family. 

Smith was elected by a 52% to 48% margin over Guevara. Her commitment to community well-being and meeting residents' needs during her term included increasing public works budgets and appearing at casual events, such as a Pokémon Go event sponsored at a local park.

Election Run, 2019–2020 
Smith ran for re-election and a second term in 2019. Her platform emphasized funding education, protecting the local environment, improving transportation and reducing commute times, and meeting the needs of a diverse Fairfax population. 

In a 2019 interview, Smith pointed out that "Our county government employees, county first responders, caregivers in the healthcare and education industries cannot live in the communities that they serve, protect, help, and educate. Our workers should have the opportunity to live in the area that they spend the most time in."

Her run for re-election was endorsed by several local organizations and unions. 

Ultimately, Smith won 62.85% of the vote, while her opponent, Republican Srilekha Palle, gained 36.88%. This victory was part of a larger Democratic win that secured several legislative majorities across Virginia.

References

External links 

 Facebook: Kathy Smith for District Supervisor 
 Twitter: Kathy Smith for Sully Supervisor 
 Official website: Re-elect Kathy Smith 2019

Year of birth missing (living people)
Living people
Virginia Democrats
Members of the Fairfax County Board of Supervisors